AunaCable was a cable television, telephone and Internet product in 2002 from the merger of several regional Spanish carriers, including Madritel, Catalan Menta, the Andalusian Supercable, the Aragonese Aragón de Cable and Canarias Telecom.

During the time it operated, each region retained the name of the regional operations that preceded it, such as AunaCable Madritel in Madrid, AunaCable Menta in Catalonia, etc. 

AunaCable was absorbed by the telephone operator Retevision when it established a new operator Auna.

Cable television companies of Spain